Do Ya Thang may refer to:

 "Do Ya Thang" (Ice Cube song), 2008
 "Do Ya Thang", song by Rihanna from the deluxe edition of the 2011 album Talk That Talk

See also
 "DoYaThing", 2012 song by Gorillaz
 "Do Yo Thang", 2008 song by KJ-52